The Talk is an American talk show that debuted on October 18, 2010, as part of CBS' daytime programming block. The show was developed by actress and host Sara Gilbert.

The show features Sheryl Underwood, Amanda Kloots, Jerry O'Connell,  Akbar Gbaja-Biamila, and Natalie Morales (who serves as moderator). They discuss the latest headlines, current events, and human-interest stories while engaging in open conversation. The original concept theme focused on motherhood, and over time evolved into a broader platform.

The Talk is broadcast before a live studio audience at the CBS Studio Center in Studio City, California, each Monday through Friday at 11:00 a.m. Pacific Time Zone, and airs live on most CBS owned-and-operated station and network affiliates in the Eastern and Central United States at 2:00 p.m. Eastern Time Zone. The show is on a broadcast delay elsewhere from the Mountain Time Zone westward. The Friday shows are recorded on Thursday afternoons at 1:00 pm PT for broadcast the next day. Friday shows are taped before the same studio audience in attendance for the earlier live Thursday broadcast.

Format

The Talk has a format similar in style to ABC's The View.  The opening segment of the broadcast is known as "Everybody Talks" and usually runs a combined 12 to 25 minutes over multiple segments, depending on the number of stories featured and the number of guests.  It is followed by topical discussion segments, involves the five host panel discussing current news items, typically focusing on tabloid headlines, offbeat stories, and celebrity news. The program also actively incorporates social media to allow viewers to provide their opinions on the stories discussed through Twitter (using the hashtag #EverybodyTalks, or alternately the abbreviated #EVBT).  In season five, the program began allowing viewers to use Instagram to record and upload videos using the aforementioned hashtags, with one or two videos being selected to air on the live broadcasts.

On most editions, the "Top Talker" serves as the final segment of the topical discussion, featuring a rotating set of contributors - most of whom are correspondents/hosts of entertainment-related newsmagazine programs or magazines or hosts of local or syndicated radio programs - providing detailed analysis of a single trending, usually celebrity-related, story. Following the "Everybody Talks" segment, all five hosts interview one or two featured celebrity guests; most of these interviews are conducted at the set's roundtable. Musical performances are also occasionally included.

The show also regularly has a cooking segment two to four times each week, with two of the panelists - rotating between any combination of Osbourne, Underwood or Inaba - assisting in the preparation of the featured recipes with the guest chef. Product giveaways are also done once per week, as part of an advertorial segment showcasing fashion/beauty products and electronics that are given away to studio audience members for attending the show, and are often tied into online deal of the day where the viewing audience can purchase the products offered at a reduced price.

To conclude the show through season 9, each episode signed off with one of the co-hosts, primarily the moderator, saying "Remember, it's always the right time to have The Talk!". With the start of season 10, the sign-off was changed to "I look forward to talking again tomorrow!" or (on Fridays/into hiatuses) "I look forward to talking again soon". Or "Tune in to see what we're talking about right here on The Talk."

Development
In December 2009, CBS announced the cancellation of As the World Turns after 54 years, and was looking for a program to replace the long-running soap opera in its time slot. Sara Gilbert approached CBS about producing a pilot that would feature six women talking about the day's headlines with opinions told through "the eyes of mothers."

On July 21, 2010, CBS announced that it had picked up the show (by then, given the title The Talk), beating out several other contenders, including a cooking show featuring Emeril Lagasse; Say It Now, a talk show featuring Valerie Bertinelli and Rove McManus; and a revamped version of the classic game show Pyramid, hosted by Andy Richter.

In the four weeks prior to the show's debut, new episodes of The Price Is Right and Let's Make a Deal, as well as repeats of The Young and the Restless, aired in the timeslot vacated by As the World Turns.

Co-hosts

Timeline

Season 1
The original panel consisted of Sara Gilbert, known for her role on the TV series Roseanne (and its short-lived reboot); Holly Robinson Peete, known for her roles on the TV series 21 Jump Street and Hangin' with Mr. Cooper; Leah Remini, known for her role as Carrie Heffernan in the 1998–2007 CBS sitcom The King of Queens; Big Brother hostess Julie Chen; and former talk show hostess/The X Factor judge Sharon Osbourne, the wife of the British rocker Ozzy Osbourne. Marissa Jaret Winokur was featured in an out-of-the studio position as the "mother on the street," dealing with issues like taking her toddler on an airplane, talking with kids about sex, talking to parents about the "child development stages" and other parental issues.

On January 14, 2011, Marissa Jaret Winokur reported that she would not be returning to the show in 2011. In an exclusive statement to People, original executive producer Brad Bessey said of Winokur's departure, "We think the world of Marissa as a creative talent, on-air personality and super mom. This is a mutual decision based on time, not talent."

When America's Got Talent resumed filming on March 2, 2011, Osbourne's daughter Kelly Osbourne began filling in for her on a substitute basis, as the show's first substitute host.

On August 26, 2011, it was announced that original co-host Leah Remini had been released from the show. On September 2, 2011, it was confirmed that Holly Robinson Peete had also been released from the show. Sharon Osbourne eventually gave opinion on their dismissals in December 2011 on The Howard Stern Show, stating: "Some people don't really know who they are, and you have to know who you are when you're in something like this. You can't pretend to be something you're not. You have to know your brand. You can't be all things to everyone."

Seasons 2–6
On August 26, 2011, CBS announced that comedian Sheryl Underwood would join the panel as a co-host at the start of its second season; Underwood was officially added to the program on September 6, 2011, beginning with that season's premiere episode.

Molly Shannon served as the (guest) co-host during the month of September 2011. Actress and comedian Aisha Tyler's addition to the panel was announced on October 23, 2011.

On October 12, 2016, The Talk featured special tributes to CBS' current soap operas The Young and the Restless and The Bold and the Beautiful and past serials As the World Turns and Guiding Light as part of the network's celebration of its then-30-year streak as the top-rated American broadcast network in daytime.

Seasons 7–10
On June 15, 2017, Aisha Tyler announced she would leave the series following the completion of the series' seventh season. She said she would return as a guest host and to promote her various projects. Her last show aired on August 4, 2017. The current hosts of The Talk auditioned ladies on air as "dates" to fill in Aisha's seat. At the start of the eighth season, some of the guest hosts included Carrie Ann Inaba, Garcelle Beauvais, Michelle Williams, and Sasheer Zamata. Hip-hop rapper Eve was announced as the fifth permanent co-host on November 14, 2017.

In a promo for the ninth season, it was revealed that all five co-hosts would return to the panel. However, Chen did not return to the show for the ninth-season premiere amid sexual misconduct allegations against her husband Les Moonves. Chen officially announced her departure from the talk show in a pre-taped message on Tuesday, September 18, 2018. On December 6, 2018, Variety announced that Inaba had been chosen to join the show as a permanent co-host and moderator, with a projected January 2019 debut. Inaba officially joined the show on January 2, 2019.

During the April 9, 2019 episode, Gilbert announced she would depart the talk show at the conclusion of its ninth season; she cited acting opportunities and her desire to produce other projects as the reason for her departure; her final episode aired on August 2, 2019.

The tenth season premiered on September 9, 2019, with Marie Osmond replacing Gilbert as co-host. In addition to Osmond's addition, a new set was unveiled. In March 2020, the show was scheduled to broadcast without an audience due to the COVID-19 pandemic in the United States, but CBS later decided to stop the show altogether out of an abundance of caution. The show was quickly revamped as The Talk @Home and began broadcast using Zoom, featuring each host from their own homes. Osmond departed the talk show in September 2020.

Season 11
Season 11 of the show premiered on September 21, 2020, with the hosts returning to a new set redesigned to promote social distancing between the hosts due to the continuing global pandemic by removing the table that the hosts previously sat behind the previous seasons. Inaba, Osbourne and Underwood had a chair on the stage while Eve used a monitor screen to broadcast from London due to the travel restrictions between the US and the UK. Originally, Osbourne was scheduled to return to be in the studio on the day of the premiere but (due to a diagnosis that revealed that the daughter of her son Jack had tested positive for COVID-19 just before the premiere), Osbourne had to be placed in quarantine, and thus would be appearing for the first two weeks of the season via Zoom call with a similar screen to the one Eve used. Additionally, when Osbourne was cleared to return to the studio and be on set, Inaba had to broadcast via Zoom call for a day due to feeling under the weather and because her autoimmune disorder increases the risk of her contracting COVID-19.
On December 11, Inaba would inform her fans via social media that she had tested positive for the virus which caused her to be unable to be part of the final episodes of the year before the holiday hiatus (which included Eve's farewell episode) and on December 15 Osbourne revealed that she too had tested positive for the virus as well but was quarantining away from her husband Ozzy.

On November 2, 2020, Eve announced she would leave the show in December 2020, due to COVID-19 travel restrictions, an impending lockdown in London, and her desire to expand her family. On December 1 of the same year, it was announced Amanda Kloots and Elaine Welteroth were chosen to join the panel; they made their first appearances as co-hosts on January 4, 2021, as all five were hosting from their respective homes as a precautionary measure due to a high spike in COVID infections in the LA area. After a week of remote episodes, they returned to the studio on January 11.

On March 10, 2021, Osbourne and Underwood got into a heated debate when discussing critical remarks that British journalist Piers Morgan had made the day before on Good Morning Britain about Meghan, Duchess of Sussex. (The backlash to those remarks caused him to quit the program later that day). Osbourne, who is friends with Morgan, defended his right to express his opinion, adding that she didn't agree with charging him as "racist" for his opinion. Underwood countered that Morgan's remarks were racist, and that Osbourne was thus giving "validation or safe haven" to racism; Osbourne forcefully denied this charge. The show took a hiatus for the next few days while the network investigated the altercation.

During that time, former The Talk co-hosts Leah Remini and Holly Robinson Peete both took to social media to reproach Osbourne over her behaviors against Underwood, also stating that they along with other cast members of the show had been treated similarly by Osbourne. Peete and Remini additionally charged Osbourne with other forms of misconduct, including bullying and discrimination. Osbourne responded with threats of defamation lawsuits against both women, though ultimately she did not sue.

On March 26, 2021, it was announced that Osbourne had been fired from the show after the investigation.

On April 26, 2021, Inaba announced she would take a leave of absence from the show.

On July 14, 2021, it was announced that Jerry O'Connell would be joining the show as a permanent co-host, replacing Osbourne. O'Connell became the first full-time male co-host on the show.

Seasons 12–13
On August 20, 2021, it was confirmed that Inaba would not be returning to the show for the upcoming season.

On August 31, 2021, Welteroth announced that she wouldn't be returning for the upcoming season either.

On September 2, 2021, it was announced that Akbar Gbaja-Biamila would join the show as a co-host, and the second full-time male co-host on the show.

On October 4, 2021, it was confirmed that Natalie Morales would join the show as a permanent co-host and moderator. Morales joined the show on October 11, 2021.

On April 18, 2022, CBS renewed The Talk for a thirteenth season with Underwood, Kloots, O'Connell, Gbaja-Biamila and Morales all set to return.

Notable events

Season premieres
The first week of shows featured several celebrity guests, including model Christie Brinkley, singer/actress Jennifer Lopez, actress/director Chandra Wilson, actress/author Jamie Lee Curtis, and former South Carolina first lady Jenny Sanford.

The third-season premiere (aired on September 10, 2012) featured all five co-hosts, as well as members of the studio audience, without their make-up and dressed in robes during the broadcast; all of the co-hosts were also shown beside pictures of themselves with make-up. The guests for that edition, who also participated in the stunt, were Jamie Lee Curtis; Michelle Stafford and Melody Thomas Scott of The Young and the Restless; and Katherine Kelly Lang of The Bold and the Beautiful.

The premiere weeks of the fourth and fifth seasons (September 9 to 13, 2013 and September 8 to 12, 2014) featured "The Talk Tells All", a daily feature on the season's first week of shows in which co-hosts Chen, Gilbert, Osbourne, Tyler and Underwood revealed never-before-disclosed personal secrets on-air.

Season six premiered on September 14, 2015, with a slightly new set design featuring three new large monitors with backdrops including palm trees and the Los Angeles skyline. Season seven premiered on September 12, 2016, with the same set. The hosts kicked off premiere week by unveiling answers to the viewers' biggest questions with a theme they called "The 7 Wonders of The Talk."

On-location editions
The show made two trips to New York City during its second season, broadcasting live for one week on each trip. The first trip placed some audience members inside and some outside the studio. Beginning with the second trip, the show began to tape its New York City-based episodes in a studio at the CBS Broadcast Center, similar in structure to its Los Angeles studio, with the audience members based within the soundstage. The Talk has done week-long broadcasts from New York City twice per season since then (usually during the February and May Nielsen ratings periods and in December), with the Thursday and Friday episodes being recorded on the same day as the Tuesday and Wednesday live broadcasts. The program's first set of New York City episodes in the third season (from December 10 to 14, 2012), featured a partnership with Toys for Tots, asking all guests and audience members to bring a new unwrapped toy to donate to the charity.

During the third season, The Talk broadcast a week of episodes from New Orleans, Louisiana – site of Super Bowl XLVII - from January 28, 2013, to February 1, 2013, to help promote CBS's coverage of the National Football League championship game.

The Talk After Dark
From January 12–16, 2015, The Talk aired special late-night episodes, billed as The Talk After Dark. Recorded each afternoon that week before the studio audience in attendance for the earlier live daytime broadcasts, the episodes featured a separate slate of guests and featured topics from the daytime editions. They also included a house band led by musician Linda Perry, wife of series creator and co-host Sara Gilbert. The episodes were broadcast in the 12:37 a.m ET timeslot normally occupied by The Late Late Show—which itself utilized guest hosts on most other weeks in the four-month period between Craig Ferguson's departure in December 2014, and the start of James Corden's tenure as host of that program in March 2015.

The Talk: Keep Talking
From March 15 to 16, 2018, The Talk aired two exclusive episodes on their Facebook page entitled Keep Talking as CBS broadcast the NCAA Division I men's basketball tournament games on the aforementioned dates. This special edition featured all five co-hosts communicating with their Facebook fans asking them personal questions and advice for their own personal problems. Unlike a normal episode the topics are decided entirely by the fans. Both episodes are similar to The Real's online exclusive segments and both episodes are around four minutes.

The Talk: @Home
Carrie Ann Inaba announced on the March 12, 2020 episode that due to the COVID-19 pandemic, The Talk would broadcast without an audience. Afterwards CBS halted the in-studio production of The Talk. Once CBS forced the production to shut down, Inaba began hosting a daily Instagram live from her own home during the stay-at-home order. CBS greenlit Inaba's show while including all five co-hosts under a new format titled The Talk: Chat Room which aired via Instagram Live. On March 30, 2020, the show began using Zoom, allowing the show's hosts (and guests) to broadcast from their homes. The format of the show remained the same starting with discussions from trending current events, host discussions, and having guests join who were also using the same video platform. The @Home format arose from the hosts doing a daily Instagram broadcast each day at the same time the show was scheduled to air. The show continued to use the @Home format until September 14, 2020, when the show returned to the newly reconfigured studio for the Season 11 premiere.

Appearances in other media

 All of The Talk hosts (including Julie Chen, Sara Gilbert, and Aisha Tyler) made a cameo appearance on the Supergirl episode "Falling", which aired on March 14, 2016. In the episode, Cat Grant (played by Calista Flockhart) makes a guest appearance on the Arrowverse's iteration of The Talk.
 All of the then-hosts, again playing themselves, appeared on the episode "Chapter Seventy-Four" of Jane the Virgin (directed by Gina Rodriguez), which aired on February 9, 2018.

Reception

Ratings
The debut episode of The Talk was number one in its timeslot in 20 of the 56 markets. As of October 2011, The Talk averaged 1.83 million viewers per episode, a 25% decrease from As the World Turns ratings the previous year.

By June 2012, The Talk averaged 1.7/6 in households, 2.29 million viewers, 1.1/7 in women 25–54 and 0.8/5 in women 18–49. The women 25–54 rating was The Talks highest since the week ending February 17, while the women 18–49 rating was the best since the week ending May 4. Compared to the same week last year, The Talk was up +21% in households (from 1.4/4), +24% in viewers (from. 1.85m), +38% in women 25–54 (from 0.8/5) and +33% in women 18–49 (from 0.6/4).

Criticism
The Talk was criticized for a segment where some panelists made light of male genital mutilation. Osbourne said, "However, I do think it is quite fabulous" in response to a story where a wife had drugged her husband, cut off his penis, and put it in the garbage disposal due to his filing for divorce. An apology was made during a subsequent show.

The failure to disclose on-air why Remini and Robinson Peete were released, or even to mention them, prompted criticism of the show from some viewers, with some fans of the two stars protesting their dismissals.

Just weeks before the start of the 11th season it was announced that Osmond would leave the show stating her desire to pursue new projects. Sharon Osbourne threatened to leave the show if CBS did not fire Osmond while Inaba wanted her to stay on the show causing tension among the hosts. Throughout the 10th season there was reported tension between Osbourne and Osmond on the set and was noticed by viewers of the show. Once it was announced by CBS that Osmond would be departing, the show faced extreme backlash on social media with negative comments.

In a taped episode on March 10, 2021, a heated discussion between Osbourne and Underwood, concerning Piers Morgan’s comments about Meghan, Duchess of Sussex following the broadcast of Oprah with Meghan and Harry, received significant criticism from viewers. Osbourne apologized on Twitter. The program led to an internal review with the show not being broadcast on March 15 and 16. However, it was revealed on March 16, that the show would be going into an extended hiatus, following former co-host Remini accusing Osbourne of saying racist and homophobic slurs about fellow former co-hosts Robinson Peete, Chen, and Gilbert. Later that month, it was announced that Osbourne departed the series, and that the show would return after an extended hiatus on April 12.

Awards and nominations

International broadcasts
 In Australia, The Talk began broadcasting on August 6, 2012, on Network 10, as a replacement for controversially axed local talk show The Circle. The Talk rates lower than the former local offering, achieving just 29,000 viewers on August 15 compared to the axed show's 39,000 two months earlier, and well below rival programs Seven Network's The Morning Show and Nine Network's Today Extra which rated 200,000 and 119,000 viewers respectively. In 2017, CBS Corporation purchased Ten Network Holdings, the parent company of Network Ten. Currently it airs against the main breakfast programmes on Seven and Nine, as a lead-out from CBS Mornings.
 In Canada, The Talk airs simultaneously on the Global Television Network and on CJON-DT in Newfoundland and Labrador.
 In the United Kingdom, The Talk began being broadcasting on July 4, 2011, on Diva TV.
 In South Africa, The Talk began broadcasting on April 1, 2011, in the 1 pm timeslot on M-Net.
 In the Philippines, the program was formerly aired on Solar News Channel, but they discontinued airing in September 2013 after season 4 is aired. Season 5 is aired of March 2015 on CT.
 In the Czech Republic, The Talk airs on Prima Love.
 In New Zealand, The Talk began broadcasting on January 23, 2012, on TV3.
 In the Arab world, The Talk airs on MBC 4.

References

External links
 
 

2010 American television series debuts
2010s American television talk shows
2020s American television talk shows
CBS original programming
English-language television shows
Television series by CBS Studios
Television shows set in Los Angeles
Television shows filmed in Los Angeles
Television productions suspended due to the COVID-19 pandemic
Television controversies in the United States